Vivian Edna Watts (born June 7, 1940) is an American politician who is serving as a Democrat in the Virginia House of Delegates. She currently represents the 39th district, which includes part of Fairfax County.

Between 2009 and 2019, Watts introduced and passed 45 pieces of legislation that became law.

, Watts serves as the Chair of the Finance Committee, Vice Chair of the Courts of Justice Committee, and as a member of the Rules Committee and Transportation Committee.

Career
Before entering politics, Watts was the Executive Director of Fairfax Court Appointed Special Advocates in cases involving severe abuse and neglect of children.

Watts was first elected in 1981, and left to serve as the state's Secretary of Transportation and Public Safety in 1986; she was again elected to the House in 1996 and continuously since.

In 2017, Watts became the longest-serving woman ever in the Virginia House of Delegates.

Legislative issues
Watts' has focused on progressive tax policies and increased funding for education and transportation.

In 2019, Watts said her top three legislative priorities were to restore transportation funding, restructure and expand mental health services, and make the state's school funding formula more equitable.

Awards and recognition
Watts has been awarded the Virginia Counselors Association Outstanding Legislator Award, Virginia Association of Commonwealth Attorneys “Champion of Justice” Award, League of Women Voters of Virginia Good Governance Award, and the Virginia Interfaith Center "Legislator of the Year" Award.

Personal life
She was born in Detroit, Michigan, but has been a resident of Virginia since 1963, and has four grandchildren. She married her husband, David Watts, in 1960.

Watts has authored two books on public safety and criminal justice through a U.S. Justice Department grant.

References

External links
 (campaign finance)

Project Vote Smart - Representative Vivian Edna Watts (VA) profile
Follow the Money - Vivian E. Watts
2005 2003 2001 1999 campaign contributions

Democratic Party members of the Virginia House of Delegates
State cabinet secretaries of Virginia
1940 births
Living people
University of Michigan alumni
People from Annandale, Virginia
Women state legislators in Virginia
Politicians from Detroit
21st-century American politicians
21st-century American women politicians
20th-century American politicians
20th-century American women politicians